The 2015–16 Carolina Hurricanes season was the 37th season for the National Hockey League (NHL) franchise that was established on June 22, 1979 (following seven seasons of play in the World Hockey Association), and 18th season since the franchise relocated from Hartford to start the 1997–98 NHL season. The season will begin its regular games on October 8, 2015 against the Nashville Predators.

Standings

Schedule and results

Pre-season

Regular season

Player stats 
Final stats

Skaters

Goaltenders

†Denotes player spent time with another team before joining the Hurricanes. Stats reflect time with the Hurricanes only.
‡Denotes player was traded mid-season. Stats reflect time with the Hurricanes only.
Bold/italics denotes franchise record.

Awards and honours

Awards

Milestones

Transactions 

The Hurricanes have been involved in the following transactions during the 2015–16 season.

Trades

Notes
Carolina to retain 50% ($4.125 million) of salary as part of trade.

Free agents acquired

Free agents lost

Claimed via waivers

Lost via waivers

Lost via retirement

Players released

Player signings

Draft picks

Below are the Carolina Hurricanes' selections at the 2015 NHL Entry Draft, held on June 26–27, 2015 at the BB&T Center in Sunrise, Florida.

Draft notes

 The Arizona Coyotes' fourth-round pick went the Carolina Hurricanes as the result of a trade on February 28, 2015 that sent Tim Gleason to Washington in exchange for Jack Hillen and this pick.
Washington previously acquired this pick as the result of a trade on March 4, 2014 that sent Martin Erat and John Mitchell to Phoenix in exchange for Rostislav Klesla, Chris Brown and this pick.
 The Winnipeg Jets' fifth-round pick went to the Carolina Hurricanes as the result of a trade on February 25, 2015 that sent Jiri Tlusty to Winnipeg in exchange for a third-round pick in 2016 and this pick (being conditional at the time of the trade). The condition – Carolina will receive a fifth-round pick in 2015 if Winnipeg qualifies for the 2015 Stanley Cup playoffs – was converted on April 9, 2015.
 The Ottawa Senators' sixth-round pick went to the Carolina Hurricanes as the result of a trade on December 18, 2014 that sent Jay Harrison to Winnipeg in exchange for this pick.
Winnipeg previously acquired this pick as the result of a trade on June 28, 2014 that sent a seventh-round pick in 2014 to Ottawa in exchange for this pick.

References

Carolina Hurricanes seasons
Carolina Hurricanes season, 2015-16
Carolina Hurricanes
Carolina Hurricanes